Anna University - Pattukottai Campus, Rajamadam (AU-PKT), Rajamadam, Pattukottai is a University Affiliated - University College (or) Campus of Anna University of Technology, Tiruchirappalli established on 15.09.09 at Rajamadam, Pattukkottai Taluk, Thanjavur district, Tamil Nadu, India. Now it is a part of Anna University

Academics 

Anna University - Pattukottai Campus, Rajamadam offers 5 courses and it has 7 branches

Students' association 
The students of the Main Campus have formed an association to involve in various academic and extra curricular activities.
association of mechanical engineering department:
started by 2009-2013 batch the pattukkottai campus, and 2014 Mechanical Engineering Association had conducted the Technical Symposium and National Robotics Championship 2014.

References

External links 
 www.universitycollege.webs.com
 Anna University of Technology Tiruchirappalli
 

Engineering colleges in Tamil Nadu